Spherical function can refer to

 Spherical harmonics
Zonal spherical function